Dittography is the accidental, erroneous act of repeating a letter, word, phrase or combination of letters by a scribe or copyist. The term is used in the field of textual criticism. The opposite phenomenon, in which a copyist omits text by skipping from a word or phrase to a similar word or phrase further on, is known as haplography.

Example
Codex Vaticanus  in John 13:14 word  is repeated twice. In Codex Vaticanus in Acts, a book of the Bible, verse 19:34, the phrase "Great is Artemis of the Ephesians" appears twice while it only appears once in other manuscripts.

References

Proofreading
Textual criticism
Textual scholarship